The United Nations Dispute Tribunal (UNDT) is the court of first instance in the internal justice system of the United Nations. It became operational on 1 July 2009. The UNDT "hears and decides cases" filed by current and former staff members "appealing administrative decisions alleged to be in non-compliance with their terms of appointment or contract of employment". The staff members as well as the Administration have a "right to appeal the judgments of the UNDT to the United Nations Appeals Tribunal (UNAT)". In order to ensure the independence of this organ, it is composed not of officials of the Organization, but by judges appointed by the Member States of the United Nations through the General Assembly, from which UNDT derives its mandate.

Procedures
As a first step in the formal system, a staff member who wishes to contest an administrative decision will have to request a management evaluation. When no resolution through informal means can be arrived at, and when the result of the management evaluation is not to the satisfaction of the staff member, the staff member can file an application to the United Nations Dispute Tribunal.

The UN Dispute Tribunal examines the facts of the case, and conducts, where necessary, oral proceedings. These proceedings are normally held in public. Cases before the Dispute Tribunal are usually considered by a single judge, but in cases that are particularly complex or important a three-judge panel may be convened. The judgments of the Dispute Tribunal are binding. The full text of the Statute of the UN Dispute Tribunal is contained in the annex to General Assembly resolution A/RES/63/253.

UNDT Registries
UN Dispute Tribunal has registries in New York City, Geneva and Nairobi. The geographical coverage of these is as follows:
 New York Registry: Applications from staff assigned in duty stations not covered by the Geneva and Nairobi Registries, including the Caribbean, Central and Eastern Asia (including Afghanistan, India, Kazakhstan, Pakistan, Turkmenistan and Uzbekistan), North America, South America or the Pacific. 
 Geneva Registry: Applications from staff assigned in duty stations located in Europe or part of Western Asia (including Armenia, Azerbaijan, Georgia, Russia and Turkey) 
 Nairobi Registry: Applications from staff assigned in duty stations located in Africa, the Arabian Peninsula(including Bahrain, Kuwait, Oman, Qatar, Saudi Arabia, the United Arab Emirates and Yemen), Iran, Iraq, Israel, Jordan, Lebanon, Syria, as well as Palestine;

Records of Dispute Tribunal
Parties to the proceedings, i.e., the Applicant and the Respondent, have full access to all Judicial records which are defined as "Case-related materials which form part of the official case record of the Tribunal as kept by the Registry, including, but not limited to,filings made by parties in the cases, issuances of the Tribunal, transcripts, audio and video recordings of hearings and exhibits admitted in the cases." The custodian of the records of the Dispute Tribunal is the Registry. Access to audio-visual recordings of oral proceedings, is subject to "the need to protect personal data", and are granted, usually through electronic means, on a written request addressed to the Registrar.

Relative Rank and Power of Judges 
The judges in the tribunal are given an administrative rank, and protocol status, which is below Assistant Secretary General. The relatively low rank of judges, according to the New York Times, makes those higher in UN hierarchy feel that it is "beneath them" to answer to the tribunal. Judges do not have power to declare people who do not do its bidding in contempt of court, and are thus dependent on the UN Secretariat to act in good faith in its dealings with the Tribunal. Judge Michael F. Adams, an Australian judge, at the end of his tenure in the tribunal commenting on accountability in UN system observed “Someone in the position of Under Secretary General is never confronted with the requirement that particular questions be answered.” There have been cases in which the orders of the judge to produce documents and witnesses, have been ignored by the United Nations. The United Nations response to the tribunal has, its critic argue, been contradictory, even hypocritical, in view of the organizations standing as the international guardian and promoter of rule of law. George Irving, a former lawyer with over 30 years of experience of the UN Justice system, said, “The organization has to decide from the S.G. on down whether this is an organization that respects the rule of law or not”.

UNDT Judges 

The UN Dispute Tribunal operates on a full-time basis. The UNDT was composed of "three full-time Judges, two half-time Judges and three ad litem judges". The Judges are appointed by the General Assembly. 
The resolution of the General Assembly adopted on 22 December 2018 changed the system. From July 2019, there are no longer ad litem Judges, but only 3 full-time Judges and six half-time Judges. All of them have a seven years term.
The current composition of the Tribunal is as follows:

Full Time Judges 
 New York: Ms. Joelle Adda (France) - seven-year term from July 1, 2019
 Nairobi: Ms. Agnieszka Klonowiecka-Milart (Poland) - seven-year term from July 1, 2016
 Geneva: Ms. Teresa Maria da Silva Bravo (Portugal) - seven-year term from July 1, 2016

Half Time Judges 
 Mr. Francis H.V Belle (Barbados), seven-year term from July 10, 2019
 Mr. Francesco Buffa Francesco Buffa(Italy), seven-year term from July 1, 2019
 Ms. Eleanor Donaldson-Honeywell (Trinidad and Tobago), seven-year term from July 10, 2019
 Mr. Alexander W. Hunter Jr. (United States of America), seven-year term from July 1, 2016
 Ms. Rachel Sophie Sikwese (Malawi), seven-year term from July 10, 2019
 Ms. Margaret Tibulya (Uganda), seven-year term from July 10, 2019

The current President of the Tribunal is Judge Joelle Adda.

See also
 United Nations Appeals Tribunal 
 Office of Staff Legal Assistance (OSLA)

References

External links
Statute of the United Nations Dispute Tribunal
Rules of Procedure of the United Nations Dispute Tribunal
Resolution adopted by the General Assembly on 22 December 2018

Other international administrative tribunals 
 Administrative Tribunal of the International Labour Organization
 Administrative tribunal, World Bank 
 Administrative tribunal, International Monetary Fund 
 Administrative tribunal, Council of Europe 
 Administrative tribunal, EBRD 

United Nations legislation
United Nations General Assembly subsidiary organs
Labour courts
International administrative tribunals
United Nations courts and tribunals
Courts and tribunals established in 2009